The Interstate Highways in Wisconsin comprise five current primary Interstate Highways and three auxiliary Interstates. 


Primary Interstate Highways

Auxiliary Interstate Highways

See also

References

External links
Wisconsin's Interstates at Wisconsin Highways

 
Interstate